Patiphan Pinsermsootsri  (Thai :ปฏิภาณ ปิ่นเสริมสูตรศรี; born 3 October 1996) is a Thai professional footballer who plays as a winger or attacking midfielder  for Thai League 2 club Suphanburi.

International Goals

U19

External links

1996 births
Living people
Patiphan Pinsermsootsri
Patiphan Pinsermsootsri
Patiphan Pinsermsootsri
Patiphan Pinsermsootsri
Patiphan Pinsermsootsri
Patiphan Pinsermsootsri
Patiphan Pinsermsootsri
Patiphan Pinsermsootsri
Patiphan Pinsermsootsri
Association football forwards
Patiphan Pinsermsootsri
Patiphan Pinsermsootsri
Patiphan Pinsermsootsri